Jakob Näs (30 October 1842, Munsala - 9 March 1918) was a Finnish farmer and politician. He was a member of the Diet of Finland from 1894 to 1906 and of the Parliament of Finland from 1907 to 1908, representing the Swedish People's Party of Finland (SFP).

References

1842 births
1918 deaths
People from Nykarleby
People from Vaasa Province (Grand Duchy of Finland)
Swedish-speaking Finns
Swedish People's Party of Finland politicians
Members of the Diet of Finland
Members of the Parliament of Finland (1907–08)